The South Valley Fire is a human-caused wildfire currently burning in Wasco County near Dufur in the U.S. state of Oregon. The fire is one of three fires near Dufur, specifically the active Long Hollow Fire and the contained Substation Fire. The South Valley Fire has burned . It has caused the evacuation of 400 people and threatens 100 homes. It has impacted recreational activities along the Deschutes River.

Events

The fire was started around 1:30 p.m. on August 1, 2018, near Dufur in Wasco County, Oregon. The fire grew fast, burning almost  by the evening. Level three evacuations were put in place and Governor Kate Brown call into action the emergency conflagration act as a result of the fire, sending resources. Highway 197 was closed. The Bureau of Land Management issued an evacuation for areas along the Deschutes River, specifically from Sandy Beach to Macks Canyon. As of the evening of August 1, the fire had burned an estimated . A historic barn, built in 1906, was burned by the fire.

Impact

The South Valley Fire was one of three fires to have burned in the area, adding to the heavy smoke and evacuations already in place, particularly around the community of Dufur. The fire also impacted recreational activities along the Deschutes River.

Evacuations

The following areas are under mandatory evacuation as of August 1:
 82000 block of Rail Hollow Road to the forest boundary
 All of Winslow Road and Shell Rock Road
 South of the above zone all the way south to Friend Road 
 Dufur Gap Road 
 Hix Road to Kingsley Road 
 Hwy 197 to forest boundary
 Tygh Ridge Road
 The Deschutes River from Sandy Beach to Macks Canyon

References

2018 Oregon wildfires
August 2018 events in the United States